Sunday in the Park with George is a musical with music and lyrics by Stephen Sondheim and book by James Lapine. It was inspired by the French pointillist painter Georges Seurat's painting A Sunday Afternoon on the Island of La Grande Jatte. The plot revolves around George, a fictionalized version of Seurat, who immerses himself deeply in painting his masterpiece, and his great-grandson (also named George), a conflicted and cynical contemporary artist. The Broadway production opened in 1984.

The musical won the 1985 Pulitzer Prize for Drama, two Tony Awards for design (and a nomination for Best Musical), numerous Drama Desk Awards, the 1991 Olivier Award for Best Musical and the 2007 Olivier Award for Outstanding Musical Production. It has enjoyed several major revivals, including the 2005–06 UK production first presented at the Menier Chocolate Factory, its subsequent 2008 Broadway transfer, and a 2017 Broadway revival.

Synopsis

Act I
In 1884, Georges Seurat, known as George in the musical, is sketching studies for his painting A Sunday Afternoon on the Island of La Grande Jatte. He announces to the audience, "White, a blank page or canvas. The challenge: bring order to the whole, through design, composition, tension, balance, light and harmony." He conjures up the painting's setting, a small suburban park on an island, and retains some control of his surroundings as he draws them. His longtime mistress, Dot, models for him, despite her frustration at having to get up early on a Sunday ("Sunday in the Park with George").

More park regulars begin to arrive: a quarrelsome Old Lady and her Nurse discuss how Paris is changing to accommodate a tower for the International Exposition, but the Nurse is more interested in a German coachman, Franz. The quiet of the park is interrupted by a group of rude bathers. George freezes them with a gesture, making them the subjects of his first painting, Bathers at Asnières.

The setting abruptly changes to a gallery where the painting is on display. Jules (a more successful artist friend of George's) and his wife Yvonne think George's work has "No Life". Back on the island, Jules and Yvonne have a short discussion with George and depart. They take their coachman Franz with them, interrupting his rendezvous with the Nurse. Dot, who has grown tired of standing still in the early morning sunlight, leaves the park mollified after George promises to take her to the Follies. George approaches the Old Lady, revealed to be his mother, and asks to draw her, but she bluntly refuses.

In his studio, George works on his painting obsessively while Dot prepares for their date and fantasizes about being a Follies girl ("Color and Light"). When George briefly stops painting to clean his brushes, he and Dot reflect on how fascinated they are by each other. Dot is ready to leave, but George chooses to continue painting instead, greatly upsetting her.

In the park on a Sunday some time later, George sketches a disgruntled Boatman to the disapproval of an observing Jules. Dot enters on the arm of Louis, a baker. Two chatting shopgirls, both named Celeste, notice Dot with a new man ("Gossip"). When Jules and Yvonne's daughter Louise attempts to pet the Boatman's dog, he shouts at her, then lashes out at George and storms off. George and Dot have a strained conversation as she works on the grammar book she is using to teach herself how to read and write.

As Jules and Yvonne mock the unconventional nature of George's art, they discuss an initiative to have his work included in the next group show, which they both protest. George sketches two dogs while whimsically trying to imagine the world from their perspective, describing their relief to be free of their routines on Sunday ("The Dog Song").

As the day goes on, George quietly sketches denizens of the park ("The Day Off"): The two Celestes try to attract the attention of a pair of Soldiers, fighting over which will get the more handsome of the two; the Nurse hides from the Old Lady and attempts to attract Franz's attention; Franz and his wife Frieda argue with Louise and each other; a pair of wealthy American tourists pass by, hating everything about Paris but the pastries, and plan to return home with a baker in tow; Jules returns to further lecture George on his shortcomings as an artist, receiving in response an invitation to see his new painting; the Boatman reappears to rebuke artists' condescending attitude.

Dot sees George, but he slips away before she can speak to him, and in retaliation, she describes her satisfying new life with Louis. She clearly misses and loves George, but Louis loves, respects and needs her in a way George cannot, and she has made her choice ("Everybody Loves Louis").

As the park empties for the evening, George returns. He misses Dot and laments that his art has alienated him from those important to him, but resigns himself to the likelihood that creative fulfillment may always take precedence for him over personal happiness ("Finishing the Hat").

Time has passed, and a heavily pregnant Dot visits George's studio. She asks for a painting George made of her, but he refuses. Jules and Yvonne come to the studio to see George's nearly finished painting. While Jules goes with George to see the painting, Yvonne and Dot hold a wary conversation. They realize they have both felt neglected by an artist, their mutual dislike fades, and they discuss the difficulties of trying to maintain a romantic relationship with an artist.

Meanwhile, Jules is puzzled by George's new technique and concerned that his obsession with his work is alienating him from his fellow artists and collectors alike. He refuses to support the work. Jules and Yvonne leave, and George, having forgotten Dot was there, goes back to work. Dot reveals the real reason for her visit: Despite the obvious fact that George fathered her unborn child, she and Louis are getting married and leaving for America. George angrily retreats behind his canvas, and she begs him to react in some way to her news. They argue bitterly about their failed relationship, and Dot concludes sadly that while George may be capable of self-fulfillment, she is not, and they must part ("We Do Not Belong Together").

In the park, the Old Lady finally agrees to sit for George, losing herself in fond memories of his childhood that George repeatedly disputes. She bemoans Paris's changing skyline, and he encourages her to see the beauty in the world as it is, rather than how it had been ("Beautiful"). The American Tourists arrive with Louis and Dot, who holds her newborn daughter, Marie. George refuses to acknowledge her as his child, and says that Louis will be able to care for her in a way that he cannot before offering a feeble apology as Dot sadly departs.

The park grows noisy: the Celestes and the Soldier argue over their respective breakups while Jules and Frieda sneak away to have a tryst. Louise informs Yvonne of her father's infidelity and a fight breaks out among Jules, Yvonne, Franz, and Frieda. The Celestes and the Soldier squabble noisily, and soon all the park-goers are fighting until the Old Lady shouts, "Remember, George!", and he stops them all with a gesture. George takes control of the subjects of his painting, who sing in harmony, transforming them into the final tableau of his finished painting ("Sunday").

Act II
As the curtain opens the characters, still in the tableau, complain about being stuck in the painting ("It's Hot Up Here"). The characters deliver short eulogies for George, who died suddenly at 31. The stage transforms back to a blank, white canvas.

The action fast-forwards a century to 1984. George and Dot's great-grandson, also an artist named George, is at a museum unveiling his latest work, a reflection on Seurat's painting in the form of a light machine called "Chromolume #7." George presents the work, grounding its connection to the painting by inviting his 98-year-old grandmother, Marie, to help him present the work. Marie shares her family history, describing how her mother, Dot, informed her on her deathbed that she was Seurat's daughter. George is skeptical of that bit of family lore, but Marie insists that the notes in Dot's grammar book, which mention George, are proof. After a brief technical failure, the Chromolume is unveiled.

At the reception, various patrons and curators congratulate George on his work while George flits among them, commenting on the difficulties of producing modern art ("Putting It Together"). Like his great-grandfather, he conjures his surroundings, allowing himself to hold multiple conversations at once. The only voice he finds he cannot ignore is that of an art critic who advises him that he is repeating himself and wasting his gifts. After the museum's patrons have left for dinner, Marie speaks to her mother's image in the painting, worrying about George. When he arrives to take her home, she tells him about her mother, attempting to pass on a message about the legacy we leave behind ("Children and Art"). She dozes off and George, alone with the painting, realizes he is lacking connection.

Weeks later, Marie has died and George has been invited by the French government to do a presentation of the Chromolume on the island the painting depicts. There George reveals to his friend Dennis that he has turned down his next commission. Feeling adrift and unsure, George reads from a book he inherited from his grandmother—the same one Dot used to learn to read—and ponders the similarities between himself and his great-grandfather ("Lesson #8").

A vision of Dot appears and greets George, whom she addresses as if he were the George she knew. He confides his doubts to her and she tells him to stop worrying about whether his choices are right and simply make them ("Move On"). George finds some words written in the back of the book—the words George often muttered while he worked. As George reads them aloud the characters from the painting fill the stage and recreate their tableau ("Sunday"). As they leave and the stage resembles a blank canvas, George reads: "White: a blank page or canvas. His favorite—so many possibilities."

History
After the failure and scathing critical reception of Merrily We Roll Along in 1981 (it closed after 16 performances), Sondheim announced his intention to quit musical theatre. Lapine persuaded him to return to the theatrical world after the two were inspired by A Sunday Afternoon on the Island of La Grande Jatte. They spent several days at the Art Institute of Chicago studying the painting. Lapine noted that one major figure was missing from the canvas: the artist himself. This observation provided the springboard for Sunday and the production evolved into a meditation on art, emotional connection and community.

The musical fictionalizes Seurat's life. In fact, neither of his children survived beyond infancy, so he had no heirs. Seurat's common-law wife was Madeleine Knobloch, who gave birth to his two sons, one after his death. Unlike Dot, Knobloch was living with Seurat when he died, and did not emigrate to America. She died of cirrhosis of the liver at the age of 35.

Productions

Original Off-Broadway production
The show opened Off-Broadway at Playwrights Horizons, starring Mandy Patinkin and Bernadette Peters, in July 1983 and ran for 25 performances. Only the first act was performed, which was still in development. The first act was fleshed out and work began on the second during that time; the complete two-act show premiered during the last three performances.<ref>Zadan, Craig. Sondheim & Co.", 1986, pp. 303-306, </ref> After seeing the show at Playwrights, composer Leonard Bernstein wrote to his friend Sondheim, calling the show "brilliant, deeply conceived, canny, magisterial and by far the most personal statement I've heard from you thus far. Bravo." Kelsey Grammer (Young Man on the Bank and Soldier), Mary Elizabeth Mastrantonio (Celeste #2) and Christine Baranski (Clarisse, who was later renamed Yvonne) were in the off-Broadway production but did not continue with the show to Broadway.http://www./sunday.html#OBWP 

Original Broadway production
The musical began previews on April 2, 1984 at the Booth Theatre on Broadway and officially opened on May 2, 1984. The second act was finalized and the show was "frozen" only a few days before the opening.

Lapine directed and Patinkin and Peters starred, with scenic design by Tony Straiges, costume design by Patricia Zipprodt and Ann Hould-Ward, lighting by Richard Nelson, and special effects by Bran Ferren. In his New York Times review of Sunday in the Park with George Frank Rich wrote, "What Mr. Lapine, his designers and the special-effects wizard Bran Ferren have arranged is simply gorgeous." It was the first Broadway show to utilize projection mapping (onto the spherical surface topping the Chromolume #7 sculpture), and high powered lasers that broke the 4th wall, traveling throughout the audience.Sunday opened on Broadway to mixed critical responses. The New York Times theatre critic Frank Rich wrote: "I do know... that Mr. Sondheim and Mr. Lapine have created an audacious, haunting and, in its own intensely personal way, touching work. Even when it fails—as it does on occasion—Sunday in the Park is setting the stage for even more sustained theatrical innovations yet to come." The musical enjoyed a healthy box office, though it ultimately lost money; it closed on October 13, 1985, after 604 performances and 35 previews.

Although it was considered a brilliant artistic achievement for Sondheim and nominated for ten Tony Awards, the show won only two, both for design. (The major winner of the night was Jerry Herman's La Cage aux Folles. In his acceptance speech Herman noted that the "simple, hummable tune" was still alive on Broadway, a remark some perceived as criticism of Sondheim's pointillistic score. Herman later denied that that had been his intention.) Sunday won the New York Drama Critics Circle Award for Outstanding Musical and Sondheim and Lapine were awarded the Pulitzer Prize for Drama. Sunday is one of only ten musicals to win a Pulitzer.

On May 15, 1994, the original cast of Sunday in the Park with George returned to Broadway for a tenth anniversary concert, which was also a benefit for "Friends in Deed".

Original London production
The first London production opened at the Royal National Theatre on March 15, 1990, and ran for 117 performances, with Philip Quast as George and Maria Friedman as Dot. The production was nominated for six Laurence Olivier Awards, beating Into the Woods, another collaboration between Lapine and Sondheim, to win Best New Musical (1991). Quast won the award for Best Actor in a Musical.

2005 London revival
The show's first revival was presented at the Menier Chocolate Factory in London, opening on November 14, 2005, and closing on March 17, 2006. The production starred Daniel Evans and Anna-Jane Casey, with direction by Sam Buntrock, set and costume design by David Farley, projection design by Timothy Bird, musical direction by Caroline Humphris, and new orchestrations by Jason Carr. The production transferred to the Wyndham's Theatre in London's West End, opening on May 23, 2006, and closing on September 2, 2006. Jenna Russell replaced the unavailable Casey. The revival received six Olivier Award nominations overall, and won five in total including Outstanding Musical Production, Best Actor in a Musical and Best Actress in a Musical.

2008 Broadway revival
The 2005 London production transferred to Broadway in 2008, where it was produced by Roundabout Theatre Company and Studio 54. As a limited engagement, previews started on January 25, 2008, with an opening on February 21, 2008, running through June 29 (reflecting three extensions).

Daniel Evans and Jenna Russell (who starred in the 2005-6 London production) reprised their roles with Sam Buntrock directing, musical staging by Christopher Gattelli, set and costume design by David Farley, projection design by Timothy Bird and the Knifedge Creative Network, lighting design by Ken Billington, music supervision by Caroline Humphris, orchestrations by Jason Carr and sound design by Sebastian Frost. The cast included Michael Cumpsty (Jules/Bob), Jessica Molaskey (Yvonne/Naomi), Ed Dixon (Mr./Charles Redmond), Mary Beth Peil (Old Lady/Blair), Alexander Gemignani (Boatman/Dennis), and David Turner (Franz/Lee Randolph).

Reviewers praised the script and score as well as the innovative design and the entire cast. Ben Brantley wrote in The New York Times, "The great gift of this production, first staged in London two years ago, is its quiet insistence that looking is the art by which all people shape their lives....a familiar show shimmers with a new humanity and clarity that make theatergoers see it with virgin eyes. And while Sunday remains a lopsided piece—pairing a near-perfect, self-contained first act with a lumpier, less assured second half—this production goes further than any I’ve seen in justifying the second act’s existence." As described in The New York Times, "In [Buntrock's] intimate production, live actors talk to projections, scenery darkens as day turns into night, and animation seamlessly blends into the background...In this new version, thanks to 3-D animation, the painting, currently the crown jewel of the Art Institute of Chicago, slowly comes together onstage. A sketch emerges, then color is added, and the rest gradually comes into focus, piece by piece."

The Broadway production received five Outer Critics Circle Award nominations, three Drama League Award nominations and seven Drama Desk Award nominations including Outstanding Revival of a Musical, Outstanding Actor and Actress in a Musical and Outstanding Director of a Musical. Russell and Evans also received Tony Award nominations for their performances. At the Tony Awards, Russell and Evans performed the song "Move On."

2017 Broadway revival
The show was performed in a four-performance concert version as part of New York City Center's 2016 Gala on October 24–26, 2016. Jake Gyllenhaal starred as George opposite Annaleigh Ashford as Dot/Marie.

Based on the concert's reception, a limited-run revival was presented on Broadway at the Hudson Theatre. Previews began on February 11, 2017, and the production opened on February 23 to glowing reviews, 2017. In addition to Gyllenhaal and Ashford, it featured Brooks Ashmanskas (Mr./Charles), Phillip Boykin (Boatman/Lee), Claybourne Elder (Soldier/Alex), Liz McCartney (Mrs./Harriet), Ruthie Ann Miles (Frieda/Betty), David Turner (Franz/Dennis), Jordan Gelber (Louis/Billy), Erin Davie (Yvonne/Naomi), Penny Fuller (Old Lady/Blair), and Robert Sean Leonard (Jules/Bob). The production team included James Lapine's niece Sarna Lapine (director), Ann Yee (musical staging), Beowulf Boritt (scenic design), Clint Ramos (costume design), and Ken Billington (lighting design). The producers withdrew the production from Tony Award consideration for the 2016–17 season due to its limited run, which closed on April 23.

The production was scheduled to transfer to the West End at the Savoy Theatre in 2021, after a delay caused by the COVID-19 pandemic, also starring Gyllenhaal and Ashford and directed by Lapine. The production was again delayed due to the COVID-19 pandemic with no new date given, and as of the end of 2021 has not yet happened or been rescheduled.McPhee, Ryan. "Jake Gyllenhaal and Annaleigh Ashford to Star in London Sunday in the Park With George", Playbill, June 17, 2019

Other productions
As part of the Kennedy Center Sondheim Celebration, the musical was presented in the Eisenhower Theatre from May 31, 2002, to June 28, 2002. Directed by Eric D. Schaeffer, the cast featured Raúl Esparza and Melissa Errico.

This play is of special significance for Chicago in that Seurat's masterpiece, the backdrop of the play, hangs in the Art Institute of Chicago. The Chicago Shakespeare Theater presented the musical in 2002, directed by Gary Griffin in the more intimate, 200 seat, Upstairs Theater. In September 2012, Griffin returned to direct the play in the larger downstairs Courtyard Theater. The lead roles were played by Jason Danieley as George, Carmen Cusack as Dot, and Linda Stephens as the Old Lady.

The Ravinia Festival in Highland Park, Illinois, presented a semi-staged production for three shows from September 3 to 4, 2004, with Michael Cerveris, Audra McDonald, Patti LuPone and direction by Lonny Price. New Line Theatre in St. Louis produced the show in 2004.

The team responsible for the London revival mounted a production in April 2009 at Seattle's 5th Avenue Theatre, featuring Hugh Panaro, Billie Wildrick, Patti Cohenour, Anne Allgood, Allen Fitzpatrick and Carol Swarbrick.

From April 15 through 25, 2013, the musical was performed in the English language at the Théâtre du Châtelet in Paris, directed by Lee Blakeley featuring the Orchestre Philharmonique de Radio France led by David Charles Abell. George was played by Julian Ovenden. Dot/Marie was played by Sophie-Louise Dann. For this occasion, Michael Starobin reworked his musical arrangements, which were originally tailored to an 11-piece chamber orchestra, to match a full orchestra. The production was taped for radio and TV and has been frequently broadcast in the French Mezzo HD channel which usually only rebroadcasts in-house productions of classical music, opera and jazz that were first presented live on its sister channel Mezzo Live HD.

The 2017 Broadway revival production was presented in 2023 at Pasadena Playhouse, reuniting the production team (including director Sarna Lapine and costume designer Clint Ramos), starring Graham Phillips and Krystina Alabado.

Musical numbers

Act I
"Sunday in the Park with George" – George, Dot
"No Life" – Jules, Yvonne
"Color and Light" – Dot, George
"Gossip" – Celeste #1, Celeste #2, Boatman, Nurse, Old Lady, Jules, Yvonne
"The Day Off" – George, Company
"Everybody Loves Louis" – Dot
"The One on the Left" – Soldier, Celeste #1, Celeste #2, George
"Finishing the Hat" – George
"The Day Off" (Reprise) - Company
"We Do Not Belong Together" – Dot, George
"Beautiful" – Old Lady, George
"Sunday" – Company

Act II
"It's Hot Up Here" – Company
"Chromolume #7" – Orchestra
"Putting It Together" (including the reprise of "Gossip") – Company
"Children and Art" – Marie
"Lesson #8" – George
"Move On" – George, Dot
"Sunday" (Reprise) – George, Dot, Company

Casts of major productions

 Notable Broadway replacements (1984-85)  
Georges/George: Robert Westenberg, Cris Groenendaal, Harry Groener, Howard McGillin (u/s)
Dot/Marie: Betsy Joslyn, Maryann Plunkett
Soldier/Alex: Cris Groenendaal, Howard McGillin
Franz/Dennis: Cris Groenendaal (u/s)
 Notable Broadway replacements (2017) 
Georges/George: Claybourne Elder (u/s)
Dot/Marie: Ashley Park (u/s), Jenni Barber (u/s)

Television and videoSunday in the Park with George was taped on October 21–25, 1985, at the Booth Theatre with most of the original Broadway cast. It was broadcast on American television on February 18, 1986, on Showtime and on June 16, 1986, on PBS's American Playhouse. (Bernadette Peters, who was performing in Song and Dance at the time of the taping, was given time off from that play to tape this production.) Warner Home Video released the recording on VHS on April 1, 1992; Image Entertainment released the DVD and laserdisc on March 23, 1999. The DVD includes full-length commentary by Sondheim, Lapine, Patinkin, and Peters.

An audio registration of the 2013 Paris production at the Théâtre du Châtelet was broadcast on Radio France, a video registration on TV channel Mezzo TV.

A number of Desperate Housewives episodes take their names from songs or lyrics from the musical. These are episodes 1.11 - "Move On," 1.21 - "Sunday in the Park with George," 2.7 - "Color and Light," 3.20 - "Gossip", 4.5 - "Art Isn't Easy," 4.11 - "A Vision's Just a Vision," 5.10 - "Sunday," 5.14 - "Chromolume No. 7," 8.5 - "The Art of Making Art," 8.9 - "Putting it Together," and 8.23 - "Finishing the Hat".

Cast recordings
The 1984 original Broadway cast recording was released by RCA, with a remastered version released in March 2007 (ASIN: B0009A40KW). Produced by Thomas Z. Shepard, the recording won the 1984 Grammy Award for Best Cast Show Album.

The 2005 London revival cast recording was released by PS Classics (2 disc set) on May 30, 2006 (ASIN: B000EZ9048). The most complete recording of the score to date, it contains a bonus track, the original, extended version of the cut "soldier song", "The One on the Left"—of which only a fraction survives in the final show—performed by the production's Soldier and Celestes (Christopher Colley, Sarah French-Ellis and Kaisa Hammarlund).

The 2017 Broadway revival cast recording was released by Warner Music Group.

Awards and nominations

Original Broadway production

Original London production

2005 London revival

2008 Broadway revival

References

Further reading
 Bauch, Marc. The American Musical. Marburg, Germany: Tectum Verlag, 2003.  
 Bauch, Marc. Themes and Topics of the American Musical after World War II. Marburg, Germany: Tectum Verlag, 2001.  
 Lapine, James. Putting It Together''. New York:  Farrar, Straus and Giroux, 2021.

External links

 
 
 Sunday in the Park with George on The Stephen Sondheim Reference Guide
 Sunday in the Park with George (London Revival)
 Sunday in the Park with George (Broadway revival with London revival cast, February 2008)
 Sunday in the Park with George at the Music Theatre International website
 NYPL theatrical lighting database, complete lighting paperwork, light plot, hookup, shop order, focus charts, magic sheets and Richard Nelson's production notes, original Broadway production

1983 musicals
Broadway musicals
Drama Desk Award-winning musicals
West End musicals
New York Drama Critics' Circle Award winners
Off-Broadway musicals
Pulitzer Prize for Drama-winning works
Laurence Olivier Award-winning musicals
Musical television films
Musicals by James Lapine
Musicals by Stephen Sondheim
Pulitzer Prize for Drama-winning musicals
Plays set in France
Plays set in the 19th century
Plays set in the 1980s
Cultural depictions of French men
Cultural depictions of painters
Plays set in the United States
Tony Award-winning musicals
American Playhouse